is a former Japanese football player.

Machida previously played for Roasso Kumamoto in the J2 League.

Club statistics

References

External links

1982 births
Living people
University of Tsukuba alumni
Association football people from Saitama Prefecture
Japanese footballers
J2 League players
Japan Football League players
Arte Takasaki players
Roasso Kumamoto players
Sony Sendai FC players
Association football forwards